The 2008 Continental Cup of Curling was the 6th edition of this event and was held from December 18–21, 2008 at the EnCana Arena in Camrose, Alberta. It was the first edition of the Continental Cup in which teams outside of North America and Europe competed, due to the outstanding performance of the Chinese teams in the previous year's men's and women's world championships. To reflect the expanded participation, the team opposing North America was renamed from "Team Europe" to "Team World". The World Curling Federation named the six rinks representing Team World.  The Canada Cup of Curling, Tournament of Hearts and Brier winners automatically qualify as the Canadian rinks in Team North America, while the American contingent in Team North America are represented by their men's and women's champions.  The event was won by Team World by a score of 208-192, with the winning points scored in the fourth end in the men's featured skins game.

The prize purse was $88,400 (CAD); each member of the winning team received $2000, while each member of the losing team received $1400.

The Continental Divide, the entertainment centre, was located at the adjacent Border Paving Arena.

The ice technician is Tim Yeo.

Scoring
Each match is worth a different number of points, with a total of 400 available in the event.

Broadcast
TSN televised every draw of the Continental Cup, with the men's team games and the women's feature skins games on tape-delay (while broadcast live on TSN2) and the remainder of the draws live.

Teams
Team North America was coached by  Jim Waite and captained by  Russ Howard.  Team World was coached by  Peja Lindholm and captained by  Pål Trulsen.

* Throws third rocks

Results

Women's team

Draw 1 (December 18)

Draw 4 (December 19)

Men's team

Draw 3 (December 18)

Draw 6 (December 19)

Mixed doubles

Draw 2 (December 18)

Draw 5 (December 19)

Singles
Team World wins the eight points for the greater aggregate score for singles play, 96-93.

Draw 8 - December 20

Women's Skins
Draw 7 contains the 20-point game, Draw 9 is the 30-point game, and Draw 10 is the feature game.

Draw 7 - December 20

Draw 9 - December 20

Draw 10 - December 21

Men's Skins
Draw 7 is the 20-point game, Draw 9 is the 30-point game, and Draw 10 is the feature game.

Draw 7 - December 20

Draw 9 - December 20

Draw 10 - December 21

Mixed Skins 
Draw 7 is the 20-point game, while Draw 9 is the 30-point game.

Draw 7 - December 20

Draw 9 - December 20

Sources
Official Site

Continental Cup Of Curling, 2008
Continental Cup of Curling
Sport in Camrose, Alberta
2008 in Alberta
Curling competitions in Alberta